Deh Abbasan (also Romanized as Deh ‘Abbāsān; also known as Deh ‘Abbās and Deh ‘Abbāsīān) is a village in Jalalvand Rural District, Firuzabad District, Kermanshah County, Kermanshah Province, Iran. At the 2006 census, its population was 107, in 23 families.

References 

Populated places in Kermanshah County